Mordellistenoda fukiensis is a beetle in the genus Mordellistenoda of the family Mordellidae. It was described in 1941 by Ermisch.

References

Mordellidae
Beetles described in 1941